The 219th New Jersey Legislature began on January 14, 2020, following the 2019 elections for Assembly, and one special election for Senate. It ended on January 11, 2022.

Background 
Elections will be held in November 2019 for all 80 seats in the Assembly and one Senate seat. After Senator Jeff Van Drew resigned to join The United States House of Representatives Assemblyman Bob Andrzejczak was appointed to fill his seat, creating a special election to be held in November 2019. Cumberland County Republican Chairman Mike Testa, and former Assemblyman Sam Fiocchi announced their intentions to run for the republican nomination for senate in the 1st District. In the Assembly, as of March 30, 2019, Assemblymen David Wolfe, Michael Patrick Carroll, and Assemblywomen Amy Handlin, Patricia Egan Jones have all announced their planned retirement from the Assembly. During the June primaries 8th District Assemblyman Joe Howarth lost to former Burlington County Sheriff Jean Stanfield.

The Senate seat vacated by the September 2019 death of Anthony Bucco will be filled first by an interim appointment and then by a special election in 2020.

Composition

Assembly

Senate

Leadership

Senate

Assembly

Members

Senate 
The Senate has 40 members, one for each district.

Former members from this term

† First appointed to the seat 
‡ Elected in a special election 
* Addiego had served as a Republican prior to 2019
1 Seat remained vacant for remainder of term

Assembly 
The Assembly has 80 members, two for each district.

† First appointed to the seat 
‡ Dunn was appointed to the seat in November 2019. The appointment expired at the conclusion of the 2018–19 term in January 2020. She was reappointed again in February 2020 after the start of the next term, and then won the seat in a special election in November 2020. 
± Kean previously served in the Assembly from 2002–2008 
* Caputo had served as a Republican during a previous stint in the Assembly from 1968–1972

Former members from this term

References

External links
 

New Jersey Legislature
New Jersey General Assembly by session
New Jersey Senate by session